Paradeisos may refer to:

Paradeisos (archaeological site), Late Neolithic site in Greece
Paradise (2011 film), a Greek film